Mikov Nunatak is the rocky ridge 1.35 km long in northwest–southeast direction and 590 m wide, rising to 750 m in the upper course of Zaychar Glacier and linked on the northwest to Detroit Plateau on Nordenskjöld Coast in Graham Land, Antarctica.

The feature is named after Miki Mikov, radio engineer at St. Kliment Ohridski base during the 1994/95 Bulgarian Antarctic campaign, which set the longterm directions of the Bulgarian Antarctic research.

Location
British mapping in 1978.

Maps
 British Antarctic Territory.  Scale 1:200000 topographic map. DOS 610 Series, Sheet W 64 60. Directorate of Overseas Surveys, UK, 1978
 Antarctic Digital Database (ADD). Scale 1:250000 topographic map of Antarctica. Scientific Committee on Antarctic Research (SCAR). Since 1993, regularly upgraded and updated

Notes

References
 Mikov Nunatak. SCAR Composite Gazetteer of Antarctica
 Bulgarian Antarctic Gazetteer. Antarctic Place-names Commission. (details in Bulgarian, basic data in English)

External links
 Mikov Nunatak. Adjusted Copernix satellite image

Nunataks of Graham Land
Bulgaria and the Antarctic
Nordenskjöld Coast